Nicolas John Gibb (born 3 September 1960) is a British politician serving as Minister of State for Schools since October 2022, having previously held the office from 2010 to 2012 and again from 2015 to 2021. He has served at the Department for Education under Conservative Prime Ministers David Cameron, Theresa May, Boris Johnson and Rishi Sunak. A member of the Conservative Party, Gibb has served as Member of Parliament (MP) for Bognor Regis and Littlehampton since 1997.

Gibb was born in Amersham, Buckinghamshire and was educated at the College of St Hild and St Bede at the University of Durham. After unsuccessfully campaigning to become an MP in Stoke-on-Trent Central at the 1992 general election and Rotherham in the 1994 by-election, Gibb was elected to the British House of Commons for Bognor Regis and Littlehampton at the 1997 general election.

Gibb was Shadow Minister for Schools from 2005 to 2010. He was appointed as Minister of State for School Standards by Prime Minister David Cameron, serving from May 2010 and September 2012. After serving as a backbencher for two years, Gibb returned to government as Minister of State for School Reform in July 2014. Gibb was promoted to his previous role as Minister of State for School Standards after the 2015 general election, replacing his initial successor in the Coalition government, David Laws. He retained this position during the premiership of Theresa May. He was retained as Minister of State for School Standards by May's successor, Boris Johnson; Gibb was removed from the role in September 2021. He returned to the role under Rishi Sunak in October 2022.

Early life 
Gibb was born in Amersham, Buckinghamshire and was educated at Bedford Modern School, Maidstone Grammar School, Roundhay School in Leeds, and Thornes House School in Wakefield. In an interview regarding his education, Gibb spoke of how he believed Maidstone Grammar School to be the best. "What was good about it was that it was rigorous" he told Teachers TV in 2006. "Every lesson was rigorous, even things like music: it was taught in the same way as chemistry." Wakefield, by contrast, was "terrible" due to its lack of rigour. Upon leaving school he took a job as a handyman in a London hotel, spending his evenings in the House of Commons watching late-night debates from the public gallery.

He then attended the College of St Hild and St Bede at the University of Durham where he received a Bachelor of Arts degree in Law in 1981. Gibb was a member of the Federation of Conservative Students at a time when they were influenced by radical libertarian ideas. He stood for election to the NUS committee in 1981, but only achieved a single vote after accusing the NUS of openly supporting terrorist organisations.

After leaving university Gibb was implicated in a scandal involving nomination papers for elections at the 1982 NUS conference in Blackpool, with Gibb accused of forging signatures to get Conservative candidates on to the ballot. Gibb and his brother Robbie were recruited and trained by the Russian anticommunist organisation the National Alliance of Russian Solidarists. In 1982, Gibb joined NatWest as a trainee accountant, before working on Kibbutz Merom Golan in 1983. In 1984 he joined KPMG as a chartered accountant until his election to parliament. He is a Fellow of the Institute of Chartered Accountants (FCA).

Political career 
Gibb worked as an election agent to Cecil Parkinson at the 1987 general election, and was the secretary of the Bethnal Green and Stepney Conservative Association in 1988, becoming its chairman the following year.

Gibb contested Stoke-on-Trent Central at the 1992 general election but was defeated into second place some 13,420 votes behind the sitting Labour MP Mark Fisher. In 1994, Gibb was selected to contest the Rotherham by-election, caused by the death of James Boyce. He finished in third place, 12,263 votes behind the winner Denis MacShane.

Gibb was selected to stand as the Conservative candidate for the newly created West Sussex seat of Bognor Regis and Littlehampton at the 1997 general election. Gibb won the seat with a majority of 7,321 and has remained the MP there since. He made his maiden speech on 4 July 1997.

Opposition 
Shortly after his election, Gibb joined the opposition frontbench of William Hague when he was appointed as the spokesman on trade and industry in 1997, before joining the social security select committee later in the year. The following year, in 1998 he rejoined the frontbench as a spokesman on the treasury, moving back to trade and industry in 1999.

Gibb was reportedly involved in the faction-fight between supporters of William Hague and Michael Portillo, the then shadow chancellor, as a supporter of Portillo.

He was briefly a spokesman on environment, transport and the regions following the 2001 general election but resigned under the leadership of Iain Duncan Smith, reportedly because he was unhappy at his new role. Michael Howard brought him back to the frontbench following the Conservative Party's defeat in the 2005 general election as a spokesman for Education and Young People. Shortly afterwards, the newly elected Conservative Party Leader, David Cameron, promoted Gibb from within the education team to Shadow Minister for Schools.

Government 
In the wake of the 2010 general election and the formation of a Conservative-Liberal Democrat coalition government, Gibb was appointed Minister of State for Schools in the new Department for Education. He was sacked in a reshuffle in September 2012, but returned to the same Department, again as a Minister of State, in July 2014. He was appointed to the Privy Council on 4 November 2016.

In July 2020, as Minister of State for School Standards his department oversaw the controversial derivation of GCE Advanced Level grades in place of exams cancelled due to the COVID-19 pandemic. The system was subsequently described as having the effect of "people who come from areas where people have scored low are assumed to score low this year, and people who come from areas where people have scored high are assumed to score high this year." He was later confronted on the BBC Radio 4 programme Any Questions? by a student stating that Gibb had "ruined my life". Gibb responded by saying: "It won't ruin your life, it will be sorted, I can assure you."

Gibb was sacked by the Prime Minister Boris Johnson in the September 2021 reshuffle and returned to the back benches.

On 4 February 2022, Gibb called for the Prime Minister to resign over Partygate. It was reported he had submitted a letter of no confidence in Johnson to the chairman of the 1922 Committee.

Gibbs was re-appointed as Schools Minister on 26 October 2022 by Rishi Sunak.

Views 
Gibb is a longstanding advocate of synthetic phonics as a method of teaching children to read, and is also a supporter of the motor neurone disease cause, currently being vice-chair of the All Party Motor Neurone Disease Group in parliament.

Just days after being appointed as Minister for Schools in 2010, Gibb was criticised by teachers and educationalists after leaked information suggested he had told officials at the Department of Education that he "would rather have a physics graduate from Oxbridge without a PGCE teaching in a school than a physics graduate from one of the rubbish universities with a PGCE". Later in 2012 Gibb was reported to have described attempts to include public speaking classes intending to foster empowerment among public students as "encouraging idle chatter in class". This statement was criticised by researchers at both Cambridge University and the Education Endowment Foundation who observed a link between public speaking classes and improved academic results and economic potential.

He supported the Remain campaign in the 2016 Brexit referendum.

Personal life 
Gibb is the brother of Robbie Gibb, a former PR consultant and ex-editor of the BBC's political programmes, The Daily Politics and (in an executive capacity) This Week, who was announced as Director of Communications for Prime Minister Theresa May in July 2017.

In May 2015, Gibb came out as gay and announced his engagement to Michael Simmonds, the chief executive of the Populus polling organisation. Having been together for 29 years they married in 2015.

Publications 
 Forgotten Closed Shop: Case for Voluntary Membership of Student Unions by Nicholas Gibb and David Neil-Smith, 1985, Cleveland Press 
 Simplifying Taxes by Nick Gibb, 1987
 Duty to Repeal by Nick Gibb, 1989, Adam Smith Institute 
 Bucking the Market by Nick Gibb, 1990
 Maintaining Momentum by Nick Gibb, 1992

Notes

References

External links 

 Nick Gibb MP Conservative Party
 
 Nick Gibb: GCSE Results Department for Education official channel, YouTube
 John Rentoul An Education - John Rentoul looks at the background and political beliefs of Nick Gibb, Minister of State for Schools Ethos Journal (Archived)
 

1960 births
Living people
Alumni of the College of St Hild and St Bede, Durham
Conservative Party (UK) MPs for English constituencies
People educated at Bedford Modern School
People educated at Maidstone Grammar School
People educated at Roundhay School
People from Amersham
People from Littlehampton
UK MPs 1997–2001
UK MPs 2001–2005
UK MPs 2005–2010
UK MPs 2010–2015
UK MPs 2015–2017
UK MPs 2017–2019
UK MPs 2019–present
Gay politicians
English LGBT politicians
Members of the Privy Council of the United Kingdom
LGBT members of the Parliament of the United Kingdom